Nei Braz Lopes (born May 9, 1942 in Irajá, Rio de Janeiro) is a Brazilian singer, composer, lawyer, writer and historian, specializing in Afro-Brazilian studies.

Biography
Born in Irajá in Rio de Janeiro (a traditional samba neighborhood which also brought us Zeca Pagodinho, among others), Nei Lopes graduated as an attorney at law from the University of Brazil, but at the start of the 70's abandoned his recently begun legal career to dedicate himself to music and literature. A professional composer since 1972, Nei Lopes became prominent especially through his partnership with Wilson Moreira and by their work, recorded by almost all interpreters of traditional samba. In the 80's, Nei, already acclaimed, was one of the supporters of the Pagode movement, which took samba back to the airwaves after an eclipse period.

In the 90's, Nei started partnerships with people identified with the MPB label, such as composer Guinga and Zé Renato. He also has a song with Chico Buarque.

Nei is the author of a vast book opus concerning Afro-Brazilian thematics, and samba thematics in particular. He has been working, since 1995, in the "Brazilian Encyclopedia of the African Diaspora", his most ambitious work.

Discography

With Wilson Moreira:

 1980 - A Arte Negra de Wilson Moreira & Nei Lopes - EMI
 1985 - O Partido Muito Alto de Wilson Moreira & Nei Lopes - EMI
(These were later released as a single CD)

Individually:

 1983 - Negro Mesmo - Lira-Continental
 1996 - Canto Banto - Saci
 1999 - Sincopando o Breque - CPC-Umes
 2000 - De Letra & Música - Velas
 2005 - Partido ao Cubo - Fina Flor

Literature

 1981 - O Samba na Realidade
 1988 - Bantos, Malês e Identidade Negra
 1992 - O Negro no Rio de Janeiro e sua Tradição Musical
 1996 - Dicionário Banto do Brasil (Brazilian Banto Dictionary)
 1999 - 171 - Lapa-Irajá - Casos e Enredos do Samba - Folha Seca
 2000 - Zé Keti, O Samba sem Senhor
 2000 - Logunedé, Santo Menino que Velho Respeita
 2005 - Partido Alto: Samba de Bamba - Pallas
 2008 - Historia e Cultura Africana e Afro Brasileira
 2009 - Chutando o balde
 2015 - Dicionário da História Social do Samba (Social history of Samba dictionary), 
 2019 - O preto que falava iídiche
 2019 - Agora serve o coração
 2019 - Afro-Brasil Reluzente

Further reading 

1. Bocskay, Stephen (2017). "Undesired Presences: Samba, Improvisation, and Afro-Politics in 1970s Brazil". Latin American Research Review. 52 (1): 64–78.  

2. Bocskay, Stephen (2012). Voices of Samba: Music and The Brazilian Racial Imaginary (1955-1988) (Doctorate). Providence, Rhode Island: Brown University.

References
Nei Lopes at the Agenda do Samba & Choro

1942 births
Living people
20th-century Brazilian male singers
20th-century Brazilian singers
Brazilian columnists
People from Rio de Janeiro (city)
Brazilian composers
Brazilian male writers
20th-century Brazilian historians
20th-century Brazilian lawyers
Africanists
21st-century Brazilian historians